The Sandlot 2 (also known as The Sandlot 2: The Sandlot Continues and The Sandlot Kids 2 in some territories) is a 2005 American sports comedy film directed and narrated by David Mickey Evans. It is a direct-to-DVD sequel to The Sandlot and followed by another sequel two years later, The Sandlot: Heading Home.

Plot
In a flashback back to 1962, Benny becomes Benny "the Jet" Rodriguez. The story shifts to 1972, ten years after the events of The Sandlot. A new crop of five kids now reside in San Fernando Valley in Los Angeles and play baseball at the Sandlot. Johnnie Smalls (James Willson), the little brother of Scott Smalls, has heard the legend of a ferocious dog he calls "The Great Fear", that is one of The Beast’s offspring and is owned by Mr. Mertle, who lives behind the Sandlot. David Durango (Max Lloyd-Jones) becomes the leader of the team which consists of Tarquell (Neilen Benvegnu), Mac (Brett Kelly), Saul (Cole Evan Weiss) and his little brother, Sammy (Sean Berdy), referred to as "Fingers", because he is deaf. Behind the Sandlot, the Goodfairer family lives next to Mr. Mertle.

Hayley Goodfairer (Samantha Burton), and her two friends, Jenny (McKenzie Freemantle) and Penny (Jessica King), compete with the boys over sharing the Sandlot. When the girls refuse to leave, Johnnie suggests sharing it. All but David agree. The girls are actually amazing softball players, and Johnnie asks them to join their team. The kids play a game with a little league team led by David’s rival Singleton (Reece Thompson) to determine who gets the Sandlot. When Singleton purposely hits Hayley, David punches him in retaliation and forces him and his team to permanently vacate the Sandlot.
 
Mac hits the ball over the junk wall with his new aluminum bat he got as a birthday present. As the group is about to go through a hole in the fence to retrieve it, Johnnie stops them and tells them the story of "The Great Fear". He says there was a boy who loved the comic book hero, Rapid Rocket, and believed he could run as fast. One day, he walked past Mr. Mertle's house. Mertle had forgotten to lock the backyard gate. The Great Fear got out and chased the boy. It is unknown what happened to the boy, but soon after, Mertle built a wall of assorted junk to keep his dog in. If anything went over the fence, nothing came out.
  
Johnnie accidentally launches a model Space Shuttle that was built by Hayley's NASA engineer father. It lands in Mr. Mertle's back yard, and Hayley and the others frantically think of ways to retrieve it. They hire a boy called the "Retriever", though he fails to get it and goes home. Like Benny Rodriguez from the first movie, David decides to go over the wall to retrieve the model. Here it is revealed that the little boy who was bitten by "The Great Fear" in the story was David. He retrieves the space shuttle and escapes unscathed. The Sandlot kids soon discover (just like The Beast did) that The Great Fear has gotten loose. David hops on his bike and is chased by the Great Fear. David rides through a construction site, then gets off his bike and runs back to the sandlot.

David hops over the junk wall back to Mr. Mertle's yard and falls through the tunnel that Mac used while trying to get the shuttle back. The dog knocks over the wall and saves David from suffocating. When David defeats the dog, Mr. Mertle appears, describing the situation to be like that of ten years ago when a similar ordeal happened with the characters in the first film. It is revealed that the dog's real name is Goliath. The kids eventually realize that Goliath only wanted to get out so he could visit a neighboring female dog. As the kids depart, Hayley and David share a kiss. Mr. Mertle, tired of kids thinking he is grouchy, will not build a new fence. The kids grow up and part ways. Hayley and David meet again as adults and get married.

Cast

 Max Lloyd-Jones as David "Rocket" Durango
 James Willson as Johnnie Smalls
 Samantha Burton as Hayley Goodfairer
 Brett Kelly as Mac McKing
 Cole Evan Weiss as Saul Samuelson
 Neilen Benvegnu as Tarquell
 Sean Berdy as Sammy "Fingers" Samuelson
 Jessica King as Penny
 McKenzie Freemantle as Jenny
 Griffin Reilly Evans as The Retriever
 Reece Thompson as Singleton
 Teryl Rothery as Mrs. Goodfairer
 Greg Germann as Mr. Goodfairer
 James Earl Jones as Mr. Mertle
 Steve Garvey as Little League Coach
 Austin Dunn as Kid David
 Barbara Kottmeier as Hot Young Lady
 Michael Antonakos as Boyfriend
 Celia Bond as Woman at Movie
 David Mickey Evans as Narrator aka the adult Johnnie Smalls
 Tom Guiry as Scott Smalls (flashback)
 Mike Vitar as Benjamin Franklin "Benny" "The Jet" Rodriguez (flashback)

Reception
On review aggregator website Rotten Tomatoes, it currently holds a 40% "rotten" rating based on 5 reviews, with an average rating of 4.7/10.

Sequel 
A sequel to the film, titled The Sandlot: Heading Home, was released direct-to-video on May 1, 2007.

References

External links
 
 

2005 films
2005 direct-to-video films
2000s sports films
20th Century Fox direct-to-video films
American baseball films
American coming-of-age films
American sequel films
American Sign Language films
Direct-to-video sequel films
Films directed by David M. Evans
Films set in 1972
Films set in the San Fernando Valley
Films shot in Vancouver
Films with screenplays by David Mickey Evans
2000s English-language films
2000s American films